Victor M. Snipes (legally changed later to Victor M. Turner; March 19, 1970 – April 7, 2007)  was an American basketball player. He played for Lake Land College before joining Northeastern Illinois. In 1992, he led NCAA Division I in steals with 3.44 per game. He was arrested in September 1991 for unlawful use of a weapon and was sentenced to one year of court supervision.

Born in Washington, D.C., raised in Chicago, Illinois, and eventually a resident of Kenosha, Wisconsin, Snipes died in Kenosha on April 7, 2007 at age 37. At the time of his death he was a professional welder.

References

1970 births
2007 deaths
American men's basketball players
Basketball players from Chicago
Basketball players from Washington, D.C.
Basketball players from Wisconsin
Junior college men's basketball players in the United States
Northeastern Illinois Golden Eagles men's basketball players
Point guards
Sportspeople from Kenosha, Wisconsin